Trollhättan–Vänersborg Airport  is a small regional airport situated outside Trollhättan, Sweden. Braathens Regional Airlines (BRA) has its corporate head office on the airport property.

Airlines and destinations

Statistics

References

External links

Official website

Airports in Sweden
Buildings and structures in Västra Götaland County